The Kazimierz Górski Stadium is a multi-use stadium in Płock, Poland. It is currently used mostly for football matches and is the home ground of Wisła Płock. The stadium is also known as the Stadion Wisły Płock (English: Wisła Płock Stadium) in connection with its most common host.

The stadium holds 15,000 people and was built in 1973. It is named after Kazimierz Górski. A major reconstruction of the stadium started in 2020.

Poland national team matches 
The Poland national football team has played two friendly matches at the stadium.

References

Płock
Wisła Płock
Buildings and structures in Płock
Sports venues in Masovian Voivodeship